Maple Creek may refer to:
Maple Creek, California
Rural Municipality of Maple Creek No. 111, Saskatchewan
Maple Creek, Saskatchewan
 Maple Creek (electoral district), Canadian riding in Saskatchewan
 Maple Creek (provincial electoral district), provincial riding in Saskatchewan
Maple Creek (Saskatchewan), a river in Saskatchewan
Maplecreek, Washington
Maple Creek, Wisconsin
Maple Creek crater